Psychotria plurivenia is a species of plant in the family Rubiaceae. It is endemic to Sri Lanka.

References

Flora of Sri Lanka
plurivenia
Endangered plants
Taxonomy articles created by Polbot
Plants described in 1859